Lake Rotoiti, previously also known as Lake Arthur, is a lake in the Tasman Region of New Zealand. It is a substantial mountain lake within the borders of Nelson Lakes National Park. The lake is fed by the Travers River, water from the lake flows into the Buller River. Saint Arnaud is a small community at the northern end of the lake.

The first European to see the lake was John Sylvanus Cotterell on 18 January 1843. Thomas Brunner and Charles Heaphy reached the lake in November 1843, and Heaphy named it Lake Arthur after Captain Arthur Wakefield, but the Māori name remained.
For many years the lake formed part of Nelson politician and landowner John Kerr's beloved Lake Station - including Mt Robert.
Kerr (who introduced Trout to the lake),drowned there with many believing his son Robert to be responsible. The lake and Mt Robert reverted to the crown after mismanagement by Kerr's son Robert in the years following his death.
Tramping tracks circle the lake, including the Lakehead track on the east side and the Lakeside track on the west side. There is  a water taxi service that travels the length of the lake ferrying trampers to and from the Coldwater and Lakehead huts at the head of the lake. Rotoiti is also a popular place for waterskiing and is adjacent to Mt Robert, which hosted a small club-owned skifield, until it was removed by DOC in 2005.

The lake has introduced trout which attract recreational fishers.

References

Rotoiti